Caught Up is a 1998 American crime-drama film written and directed by Darin Scott. It Was Filmed in 1997. The film stars Bokeem Woodbine and Cynda Williams.

Plot

Daryl Allen (Bokeem Woodbine) is an ex-con who has been serving time for drug charges. Now he plans to get his life straight, open up a nightclub and be a part of his son Jerome's life. His friend Trip offers to give him the $10,000 for his club. Daryl drives Trip to the bank, unaware he's taking part in a robbery, which makes him furious. During a police chase they get into a car accident. Trip is killed and Daryl is sent back to prison.

During that period, his girlfriend Trish (Cynda Williams) gets married and moves away with their son. Released after five years, Daryl meets Jake, his parole officer (Tony Todd) and is informed that if he gets into trouble again, he will serve 25 years to life in prison. Daryl meets a psychic named Vanessa Dietrich (also Cynda Williams) who looks exactly like his ex-girlfriend. They seem to be getting along until a man in a mask shoots at them. Vanessa gives Daryl a gun with which he scares the man away. The two of them spend that night together.

The next morning Daryl wakes up with a gun pointed at his head. The man holding the gun introduces himself as Vanessa's friend, Billy. He tells Daryl the gun is empty and that he was just testing him. Furious, Daryl hits Billy. Vanessa walks in and tells Daryl that she's gotten him work as a limo driver. After initially refusing to work for Billy, he eventually changes his mind and takes the job. He meets a man named Herbert (Clifton Powell), who also works for Billy and they get along very well. Later, Vanessa does a tarot card reading for Daryl which seems eerily accurate to his life.

Vanessa and Daryl go out to a club. As they leave, the masked gunman from before shows up and shoots at them. Daryl suspects that Vanessa is the reason they're being targeted. Vanessa says she thinks her ex-lover Ahmad is after her, but she doesn't know how he found her. Daryl doesn't want any more problems so he decides to stay away from Vanessa.

One night, Billy asks Daryl to deliver a car for a client. The car gets a flat tire and when Daryl goes to retrieve the spare he finds a dead body in the trunk. While trying to change the tire, a police officer pulls up and asks him what happened. As they talk the trunk opens up and the cop walks toward the car. Fearing he'll be sent back to prison for life, Daryl picks up a tire iron and prepares to knock out the officer. However the officer closes the trunk without seeing the body.

Daryl heads to Billy's office, beats him up and quits the job. On the way back to his apartment, Daryl is arrested. Herbert walks in and reveals that he is really a cop named Frank Lowden, who has been investigating Billy for months. He insists that Daryl must keep his job.

Daryl goes to Vanessa and demands that she tell the truth about what's going on. She explains that her ex, Ahmad gave her a diamond that's worth half a million dollars. This is why she's in danger. Daryl doesn't want to get involved but he spends the night with her. The next morning, Daryl wakes up with blood on his hands and Vanessa has been murdered. The police show up but he escapes through a window.

After buying a gun Daryl goes to question Billy about Ahmad. Billy claims he doesn't know anything and orders his bodyguard to hurt Daryl, but Daryl hides in a closet.

Suddenly, Billy's bodyguard is killed by Ahmad (Basil Wallace), a Jamaican mobster. His men tie Billy to a chair and question him about how to find Daryl, since he is wanted for murdering Vanessa. Ahmad discloses that Vanessa helped him steal a case of diamonds. However, she betrayed him by taking the diamonds and disappearing.

Ahmad offers Billy one diamond and once again asks him where Daryl is. Billy tells Ahmad that Daryl is in the closet, but Ahmad doesn't believe him. He orders his bodyguard to put one drop of sulfuric acid on top of Billy's head, but he accidentally puts too much and kills him. Before they leave the other bodyguard checks the closet but he doesn't see Daryl as he's hiding on the ceiling.

Daryl decides to leave town but first he pulls over and calls Trish's husband, Roger (LL Cool J). Roger says that he and Trish had a fight after which she left and has been gone for over a week. Daryl then speaks to his son, Jerome and tells him to stay out of trouble. He now believes he will never be a part of his son's life. While driving he starts to have flashbacks and realizes something isn't right. He goes back to L.A. At Vanessa's grave he digs up her body. He is shocked to discover that it is his ex-girlfriend, Trish.

Daryl follows Lowden to a house and waits for him to leave. He enters the house and finds Vanessa is alive. In an effort to escape from Ahmad she killed Trish to fake her own death. Daryl wants to take Vanessa to the police, but he is knocked out and handcuffed by Lowden. Lowden is a crooked cop who was in on the whole thing with Vanessa. They plan to sell the stolen diamonds. Suddenly, Ahmad arrives to confront Vanessa and Lowden.

Ahmad orders Vanessa to give him the diamonds. As a shootout begins, Daryl knocks a lamp over and breaks it. In the darkness everyone is killed except Daryl. Before Vanessa dies, she tells Daryl that she loves him. Daryl takes a bag of money and calls Jake from a payphone. He explains that Ahmad and his crew were the ones who shot at him and Vanessa. However, Jake tells Daryl that Ahmad didn't know where Vanessa was until he heard that she was dead. Realizing someone else was the shooter, Daryl is shocked. Suddenly a vehicle crashes into Daryl's car and he's knocked out.

Daryl awakens to someone pointing a gun at him. It is the former security guard from the bank that his friend Trip robbed. During the robbery, Trip had shot off the guards genitals so he's been stalking Daryl to get revenge. Daryl realizes that this mans actions are what led to Trish's death. Becoming angry, Daryl attacks the gunman but he gets shot and falls into the water. The man then commits suicide. Daryl emerges from the water still alive, due to the bulletproof vest he's wearing.

With the money he took from Vanessa, Daryl is now the owner of his own club and his son, Jerome, lives with him. The film ends with Daryl saying: "Life is just a game, but to win you gotta avoid getting caught up."

Cast
Bokeem Woodbine as Daryl Allen
Cynda Williams as Trish Harlin/Vanessa
Jason Carmichael as Rob
Jeffrey Combs as Security Guard
Michael Clarke Duncan as Big Black
Shedric Hunter, Jr. as Jerome
Marcus Johnson as Strap
Joseph Lindsey as Billy Grimm
LL Cool J as Roger
Courtney McLean as Bob
Jeris Poindexter as Larry
Clifton Powell as Herbert/Frank Lowden
Damon Saleem as Trip
Snoop Dogg as Kool Kitty Kat
Tony Todd as Jake Samples
Basil Wallace as Ahmad
Chris Brown as Sonny

Release
"Caught Up" was the one of the final film credits of LIVE Entertainment, which became Artisan Entertainment in July 1998 (and was in turn swallowed up by Lionsgate.)

Box office
The film opened in 713 theatres on February 27, 1998. Its opening weekend the film was able to gross $2,422,631, ranking number ten for the weekend box office. The following weekend, although opening in nine more theaters, the film was only able to pull in $1,024,103, dropping to sixteen in the ranks. By the end of its theatrical run, the film acquired a total of $6,754,958.

Soundtrack

A soundtrack containing hip hop music was released on February 24, 1998, by Noo Trybe/Virgin Records. It peaked at #30 on the Billboard 200 and #6 on the Top R&B/Hip-Hop Albums.

See also 

 List of hood films

References

External links
 
 
 
 

1998 films
Films set in Los Angeles
1990s hip hop films
Hood films
American crime drama films
Artisan Entertainment films
1998 directorial debut films
1990s English-language films
Films directed by Darin Scott
1990s American films